Magnolia aromatica is a species of plant in the family Magnoliaceae. It is found in China and Vietnam. It is threatened by habitat loss.

References

aromaticata
Vulnerable plants
Flora of China
Flora of Vietnam
Taxonomy articles created by Polbot